The 10th Central American and Caribbean Junior Championships was held in Tegucigalpa, Honduras, between 10–12 July 1992.

Medal summary

Medal winners are published by category: Junior A, Male, Junior A, Female, and Junior B. 
Complete results can be found on the World Junior Athletics History website.

Male Junior A (under 20)

Female Junior A (under 20)

Male Junior B (under 17)

Female Junior B (under 17)

Medal table (unofficial)

Participation (unofficial)

Host country Honduras and the Turks and Caicos Islands competed for the first time at the championships. Detailed result lists can be found on the World Junior Athletics History website.  An unofficial count yields a number of about 304 athletes (167 junior (under-20) and 137 youth (under-17)) from about 17 countries:

 (5)
 (2)
 (5)
 (2)
 (3)
 (19)
 (12)
 (40)
 (56)
 México (95)
 (3)
 Panamá (6)
 (43)
 (1)
 (1)
 (9)
 (2)

References

External links
Official CACAC Website
World Junior Athletics History

Central American and Caribbean Junior Championships in Athletics
1992 in Honduran sport
Central American and Caribbean Junior Championships
International athletics competitions hosted by Honduras
Ath
Ath
1992 in youth sport